The 41st Brigade was a formation of the British Army. It was one of the new army or Kitchener's Army brigades, and  assigned to the 14th (Light) Division and served on the Western Front during the First World War.

Formation
7th Battalion, King's Royal Rifle Corps (until June 1918)
8th Battalion, King's Royal Rifle Corps (until June 1918)	
7th Battalion, Rifle Brigade (until June 1918)
8th Battalion, Rifle Brigade (until June 1918)
18th Battalion, York & Lancaster Regiment (from June 1918)
29th Battalion, Durham Light Infantry (from June 1918)
33rd Battalion, London Regiment (from June 1918)
41st Machine Gun Company 
41st Trench Mortar Battery

References

Infantry brigades of the British Army in World War I